Priests are a post-punk band from Washington D.C. Formed in 2012, the band is composed of Katie Alice Greer (vocals), Daniele Daniele (drums), and G.L. Jaguar (guitar). 

Strong proponents of DIY ethic, Priests have autonomously released three EPs through their independently run label Sister Polygon Records, as well as tapes and singles from acts such as Downtown Boys, Snail Mail, Shady Hawkins, and other local D.C. bands. In an interview with the Diamondback, guitarist G.L. expressed their commitment to "do it yourself" approaches in creating exposure for corporately marginalized music, "It's important to try and make safe and supportive art spaces in communities that are very much community oriented." In 2017, Priests released their full-length debut LP Nothing Feels Natural which found itself on several best albums of 2017 lists including Billboard, NPR, the Atlantic, Will's Band of the Week, and Pitchfork. On inauguration day, just days before the release of the album, the band played an event which they helped organize called NO: A Night of Anti-Fascist Sound Resistance in the Capital of the USA at the Black Cat. Rolling Stone described the band as "forging jagged incantations that challenge norms ranging from the driving forces of capitalism to punk's own chest-beating macho traditions."

On December 12, 2019, Priests announced that they were going on an indefinite hiatus, releasing a statement reading in part, "We aren’t in a place to write another album together right now, and feel like each of us would be better served pursuing individual projects for the time being." They clarified that they did not intend to break up, saying that they were "not closing off the option of playing together in the future at some point if it feels right, but not for the foreseeable future."

Discography

Studio albums

EPs

References

External links
Sister Polygon Records official website
Don Giovanni Records official website

Musical groups established in 2012
Don Giovanni Records artists
Punk rock groups from Washington, D.C.
2012 establishments in Washington, D.C.
2019 disestablishments in Washington, D.C.